The Riley 12/4, or from 1936 the Riley 1½-litre, is a range of cars made from 1935 to 1938 by the British Riley company available with saloon, touring, and sports/racing coachwork,

Engineering
The car is powered by a four-cylinder  "12/4 Engine" with one or two Zenith carburettors. Designed by Hugh Rose, it was based on the Riley Nine engine but with some significant changes including the cylinder block and crankcase being cast as one unit. It was advanced for its day with twin camshafts mounted high in the engine block, cross flow head on some versions, and Zenith or twin SU carburettors. 

Production of the engine continued until 1955 and also powered cars sold under these model names in these model years:

 Riley 12 1939 to 1940
 Riley RMA and then Riley RME 1946 to 1955
 Riley One-Point-Five 1957 to 1965 used a BMC B-Series engine

The chassis had half-elliptic leaf springs all round and drive was to the rear wheels through either a four-speed preselector or manual gearbox. Girling rod brakes were fitted.

Coachwork
At launch three body styles were available: the Kestrel 4 light fastback saloon, the Falcon saloon and the Lynx open tourer. In 1936 the Kestrel became a six light, the Falcon was replaced by the Adelphi six light saloon and the Continental touring saloon was introduced.

References

12 4
Cars introduced in 1935
Rear-wheel-drive vehicles